Lotte in Weimar is a 1975 East German drama film directed by Egon Günther and produced by DEFA. It was entered into the 1975 Cannes Film Festival. It is based on the 1939 novel, Lotte in Weimar: The Beloved Returns by Nobel Prize–winning German novelist Thomas Mann.

Cast
 Lilli Palmer as Lotte
 Martin Hellberg as Goethe
 Rolf Ludwig as Mager, the waiter
 Hilmar Baumann as August, Goethe's son
 Jutta Hoffmann as Adele Schopenhauer
 Katharina Thalbach as Ottilie von Pogwisch
 Monika Lennartz as Charlotte, Lotte's daughter
 Norbert Christian as Professor Johann Heinrich Meyer
 Hans-Joachim Hegewald as Dr. Riemer
 Walter Lendrich as Ridel, Landkammerrat
 Dieter Mann as Karl, the butler
 Angelika Ritter as Klaerchen, the lady's maid
 Annemone Haase as Amalie Ridel
 Gisa Stoll as Mrs. Riemer
 Christa Lehmann as Mrs. Meyer

References

External links

1975 films
1975 drama films
East German films
German drama films
1970s German-language films
Films based on German novels
Films based on works by Thomas Mann
Films directed by Egon Günther
Works about Johann Wolfgang von Goethe
Cultural depictions of Johann Wolfgang von Goethe
Films set in the 1810s
The Sorrows of Young Werther
1970s German films